Wim Vanhelleputte is a Belgian businessman and corporate executive in Africa. He is the Chief Operations Executive  of MTN Group, a newly created role, to oversee Liberia, Guinea-Conakry, Guinea-Bissau, and Congo-Brazzaville since 1 August 2022. MTN is the largest telecommunications company in Africa headquartered in South Africa.

He previously served as the Chief Executive Officer at MTN Uganda from August 1, 2016, to July 30, 2022.

Before that, he served at Bharti Airtel as the Executive Director for Key Business Units in Africa comprising Gabon, Congo Brazzaville, Burkina Faso, Niger, Chad, Madagascar and Seychelles.

He is married to Babra Adoso a Ugandan businesswoman Since 2000 and together they have two children

Background and education 

He was born in Belgium and attended State University of Ghent, Belgium graduating with a Bachelor of Science in General Engineering. He furthered his studies at the same university and graduated with a Master’s Degree in Nuclear and Solid State Physics.

He later joined the Free University of Brussels still in Belgium and graduated with a Special Degree in Power Plant Management.

Career 
Wim started his professional journey in early 90s as a youth volunteer with the Red Cross organisation, he travelled from Belgium to Uganda and executed the organization’s voluntary work for three months before he relocated to Zimbabwe and became the Project Engineer for Siemens Atea, Zimbabwe supporting Telecel Zimbabwe in 1998. He was afterwards elevated to MD, Tchad Mobile, a position he held between  June 2003 and August 2004.

In 2004, he went back to Uganda and became the Managing Director of Imagine Partners Uganda between September 2004 and February 2006.

In 2006, Wim went to Senegal and became CEO for Sentel GSM, from March 2006 to July 2008.

In September 2008, Wim joined MTN as the Chief Project Officer for the MTN/CCT acquisition project in DRC between September 2008 and March 2009.He was then promoted and became the CEO of MTN Cote d’Ivoire from April 2009 to June 2015

In July 2015, Wim transferred and joined Bharti Airtel as the Executive Director for Key Business Units in Africa comprising Gabon, Congo Brazzaville, Burkina Faso, Niger, Chad, Madagascar and Seychelles.

In July 2016, Vanhelleputte returned to MTN and was appointed the CEO for MTN Uganda from July 2016 to July 2022 before he was promoted and transferred to West Africa where he is currently in working as MTN Group’s Chief Operations Executive in Charge of Congo-Brazzaville, Guinea-Bissau, Guinea-Conakry and Liberia.

Deportation From Uganda 
On February 15, 2019, Wim was deported from Uganda allegedly over national security, according to Uganda Police.

Suing Government 
On March 3, 2019, Wim sued the Uganda’s attorney general challenging his deportation order by Jeje Odongo the then country’s Internal Affairs minister on grounds that it was arbitrary, irrational and illegal. He wanted court to order for general damages for illegal detention and deportation and any other relief that court could deem fit.

Wim's Deportation Order Recalled 
On May 30, 2019, the government of Uganda reportedly having been misled over Mr. Vanhelleputte's issue revoked the deportation order, and welcomed Wim back to the country with VIP treatment

See also 

 Charles Mbire
 SYLVIA MULINGE
 MTN UGANDA

References

External links 

 MTN Uganda’s CEO Wim Vanhelleputte Expounds More on the Importance of Corporate Social Responsibility (CSR)
 My Husband Was Wrongly Deported: MTN CEO’s Wife Explains How Husband Was Kicked Out Of Uganda, Vanhelleputte Takes Govt To Court
 MTN Uganda says forcing foreign telcos to list locally may not boost Ugandan ownership
 "Mtn Group announces key appointments at three operating companies and at Group, MTN.com"
 Friends and Colleagues Bid emotional Farewell to Wim Vanhelleputte

Living people
People from Belgium, Wisconsin
21st-century men
21st-century Belgian people
Belgian businesspeople
Belgian engineers
Belgian engineers by century